Admission Free is a 1932 Pre-Code Fleischer Studios Talkartoon animated short film starring Betty Boop and featuring Bimbo and Koko the Clown.

Synopsis
Betty Boop works at a penny arcade. While singing "Change! Come get your pennies! Change! Your ten and twenties!", she gives Koko the Clown change and then Bimbo who flirts with Betty. While Bimbo contemplates images on a machine, a visual and gestural relationship is established between them.

Then Bimbo goes to a shooting gallery, where he will test his aim. When Betty is questioned by a rabbit, Bimbo chases after him, moving the action to a totally different settting: a forest. There, the forest happens to have very curious situations. Betty and Bimbo then ride into the sky on a firework rocket.

Music
Tunes on the soundtrack include "The Bowery" (which is heard at the beginning and at the end), "Shine" (sung by Betty with alternative lyrics), "Oh, You Beautiful Doll", "Where Do You Work-a, John?", "You're Driving Me Crazy", "The Sidewalks of New York", "A-Hunting We Will Go", "Goodnight, Ladies", "Anvil Chorus" from Il trovatore and "A Hot Time in the Old Town".

References

External links

Admission Free at the Cartoon Database

American animated short films
1932 short films
Betty Boop cartoons
1930s American animated films
American black-and-white films
American comedy short films
1930s English-language films
1932 animated films
Paramount Pictures short films
Fleischer Studios short films
Short films directed by Dave Fleischer
Animated films about dogs
Comedy films about clowns